Mongoceras is an extinct orthoconic nautiloid cephalopod found in the Silurian of China and Siberia. 
It is included in the Orthocerida. The family in undetermined.

Morphology
As with the Orthocerida the shell of Mongoceras is generally long and straight, with a generally central siphuncle composed of thin connecting rings. A vertical, heads down orientation in life can be inferred,  in contrast with the horizontal benthic orientation of ellesmerocerida, endocerids, and many actinocerids with their weighted ventral siphuncles.

Association 
Mongoceras has been found with Kionoceras, Geisonocers, and Sichuanoceras in Silurian reefoid formations in China, along with a suite of other benthic invertebrates. It has also been found in core samples from Siberia with Edenoceras hiliferum and Geisonoceras kureikense.

References

Prehistoric nautiloid genera
Silurian cephalopods
Silurian animals of Asia